Barren Island is a small island, with an area of 0.53 ha, in south-eastern Australia.  It is part of the Sloping Island Group, lying close to the south-eastern coast of Tasmania around the Tasman and Forestier Peninsulas.

Fauna
Recorded breeding seabird species are silver gull and kelp gull.  The three-lined skink is also present.

References

Sloping Island Group